Alessandro Pinzuti (born 10 May 1999) is an Italian competitive swimmer. He won a gold medal in the 4×100 metre medley relay and the bronze medal in the 100 metre breaststroke at the 2022 Mediterranean Games. At the 2020 European Aquatics Championships, he won a bronze medal as part of the 4×100 metre medley relay, placed seventh in the 100 metre breaststroke and eighth in the 50 metre breaststroke. At the junior level, he won silver medals in the 50 metre breaststroke at the 2017 World Junior Championships and the 2017 European Junior Championships as well as a bronze medal in the 100 metre breaststroke at the 2017 European Junior Championships.

Background
Pinzuti was born 10 May 1999 in Montepulciano, Italy. At the club level, he swims and competes for Centro Sportivo Esercito and In Sport RR.

Career

2017

2017 European Junior Championships
At the 2017 European Junior Swimming Championships in Netanya, Israel, Pinzuti won the silver medal in the 50 metre breaststroke with a time of 27.51 seconds, finishing 0.27 seconds behind the gold medalist in the event and fellow Italian Nicolò Martinenghi. He won the bronze medal in the 100 metre breaststroke with a time of 1:01.28 in the final and placed 21st in the 50 metre butterfly in 24.99 seconds.

2017 World Junior Championships

On 24 August 2017, Pinzuti placed fifth in the final of the 100 metre breaststroke at the 2017 World Junior Swimming Championships in Indianapolis, United States with a time of 1:01.01, finishing 0.77 seconds behind the bronze medalist in the event Michael Andrew of the United States. Four days later, he split a 1:00.15 for the breaststroke portion of the 4×100 metre medley relay in the prelims heats, helping qualify the relay to the final ranking first. In the finals session later in the day, he won a silver medal in the 50 metre breaststroke with a time of 27.19 seconds, finishing just 0.09 seconds behind first-place finisher Nicolò Martinenghi. For the final of the 4×100 metre medley relay, Nicolò Martinenghi substituted in for him for the breaststroke and Pinzuti won a bronze medal when the finals relay finished third in 3:36.44.

2018 European Aquatics Championships
In August 2018, Pinzuti placed twelfth in the 100 metre breaststroke with a time of 1:00.28 at the 2018 European Aquatics Championships, held at Tollcross International Swimming Centre in Glasgow, Scotland. In his next event, he swam a 27.32 and placed ninth for the semifinals of the 50 metre breaststroke. Finishing competing at the Championships, Pinzuti placed ninth in the 4×100 metre medley relay with relay teammates Thomas Ceccon, Matteo Rivolta, and Luca Dotto, swimming a 1:00:15 for the breaststroke leg of the relay to help finish in 3:37.24.

2019 World University Games
Competing at Piscina Felice Scandone in Naples as part of the Italian team for the 2019 World University Games, Pinzuti reached the semifinals stage of competition in both of his individual events, placing ninth overall in the 50 metre breaststroke with a time of 27.78 seconds and 14th in the 100 metre breaststroke in 1:01.37.

2021

2020 European Aquatics Championships

Pinzuti placed seventh in the final of the 100 metre breaststroke at the 2020 European Aquatics Championships, held at Danube Arena in Budapest, Hungary, with a time of 59.50 seconds after swimming a personal best time in the semifinals of 59.20 seconds. His time of 59.20 registered Pinzuti as the 14th-fastest performer in the event for the entirety of the 2021 year. For the 50 metre breaststroke, he placed eighth in the final with a 27.54 after swimming a personal best time of 27.11 seconds and ranking fifth in the semifinals. In his final event of the Championships, Pinzuti split a 59.60 for the breaststroke leg of the 4×100 metre medley relay in the prelims heats and won a bronze medal for his contributions when the finals relay placed third with a time of 3:29.93.

2021 International Swimming League
For the 2021 International Swimming League, PInzuti competed representing the Tokyo Frog Kings, Pinzuti placed fourth in the 100 metre breaststroke at the eighth match of the regular season with a time of 57.03 seconds. In the tenth match of the season, he placed second in the 50 metre breaststroke in 26.07 seconds. With his time of 26.07 seconds, Pinzuti tied in rank for the 14th-fastest swimmer in the short course 50 metre breaststroke for the 2021 year. His performances across five matches earning him 61 Most Valuable Player points ranked him at number 290 out of 488 competitors since the International Swimming League began in 2019.

2021 European Short Course Championships

At the 2021 European Short Course Championships held at the Palace of Water Sports in Kazan, Russia in November, Pinzuti ranked ninth in the prelims heats of the 100 metre breaststroke on day two with a time of 57.58 seconds and did not advance to the semifinals as he was the third-fastest swimmer representing Italy in the event. Three days later, the same thing happened in the 50 metre breaststroke, this time he was the third-fastest Italian, in a time of 26.21 seconds, ranked sixth overall and did not advance to the semifinals. The following day, he won a silver medal as part of the 4×50 metre mixed medley relay, swimming a 26.03 for the 50 metre breaststroke portion of the relay in the prelims heats and winning a silver medal when the finals relay, on which Nicolò Martinenghi swam the breaststroke, finished second in 1:36.39.

2022 Mediterranean Games

For the preliminaries of the 50 metre breaststroke at the 2022 Mediterranean Games in Oran, Algeria, on day two of swimming competition, Pinzuti qualified for the final along with fellow Italian Fabio Scozzoli. In the final, later the same day, he placed fourth with a time of 27.55 seconds, finishing 0.09 seconds behind bronze medalist Peter John Stevens of Slovenia. Two days later, as part of the finals relay in the 4×100 metre medley relay, which consisted of him, Lorenzo Mora (backstroke), Matteo Rivolta (butterfly), and Alessandro Bori (freestyle), he won a gold medal, splitting a time of 1:00.44 for the breaststroke leg of the relay to help finish in 3:35.77. The final morning, he swam a 1:01.50 in the preliminaries of the 100 metre breaststroke and qualified for the final ranking second. In the evening, he won the bronze medal with a time of 1:00.31.

International championships

 Pinzuti swam only in the prelims heats.

Personal best times

Long course meters (50 m pool)

Legend: h – prelims heat; sf – semifinal

Short course meters (25 m pool)

References

External links
 

1999 births
Living people
Sportspeople from the Province of Siena
Italian male swimmers
Italian male breaststroke swimmers
Competitors at the 2019 Summer Universiade
Mediterranean Games medalists in swimming
Mediterranean Games gold medalists for Italy
Mediterranean Games bronze medalists for Italy
21st-century Italian people
Swimmers at the 2022 Mediterranean Games